The Presbyterian Chapel, Rossett, is in Station Road, Rossett, Wrexham County Borough, Wales. It continues to be active as a Welsh Presbyterian church.

The church was built in 1875 to a design by the Chester architect John Douglas.  It has lancet windows and a flèche which is tiered at its base.  At the end of the gable is a timber porch.

See also
List of new churches by John Douglas

References

Chapels in Wrexham County Borough
John Douglas buildings
Churches completed in 1875
19th-century Presbyterian churches
Presbyterian churches in Wales
Gothic Revival church buildings in Wales
19th-century churches in the United Kingdom
Presbyterian Church of Wales